Matthew Peter D'Arcy (18 June 1821 – 28 November 1889) was an Irish Liberal politician.

Family and early life
D'Arcy was the son of John and Eliza (née Selgrave) D'Arcy. After receiving a MA from Trinity College, Dublin,  he first married Emma Knaresborough, daughter of William and Maria (née Corballis) Knaresborough in 1853, and they had three children: John Francis Aloysius (1854–1874); William Matthew Joseph (born 1855); and James Frederick Herbert (1857–1918).

After Emma's death in 1858, he remarried to Christina Margaret Daly, daughter of James Peter and Margaret (née Dolphin) Daly, in 1860. Before they divorced in 1887, they had six children: Emma Teresa Mary; Mary Louisa Christina; Margaret Rita Mary (1861–1915); Eliza Mary (1863–1926); Christina Mary (1867–1931); and Matthew Stephen Rodolph (1868–1901).

Political career
D'Arcy was elected  at the 1868 general election as one of the two Members of Parliament (MPs) for County Wexford. He held the seat until 1874 when he stood down.

Other activities
D'Arcy was also a Justice of the Peace and a Deputy Lieutenant and, in 1872, a High Sheriff of Dublin City.

References

External links
 

1821 births
1889 deaths
High Sheriffs of Dublin City
Irish Liberal Party MPs
UK MPs 1868–1874
Members of the Parliament of the United Kingdom for County Wexford constituencies (1801–1922)
Alumni of Trinity College Dublin